Chiara Francini (born 20 December 1976 in Florence) is an Italian actress and author.

Biography 
Born in Florence, she graduated in humanities with a thesis in literary hermeneutics.

After her graduation, she underwent a three-year theatre course in Florence, at the Teatro della Limonaia, directed by Barbara Nativi, under whose direction she played a role in Peanuts, written by Fausto Paravidino. For two consecutive years she acted in Faccia da comico under the artistic direction of Serena Dandini at the Ambra Jovinelli theatre in Rome.  She got into television through Marco Giusti, who offered her a role in Blablabla and Stracult.

She then had a part in Ragazze di San Frediano, directed by Vittorio Sindoni and in 2007 she was Marcia Meniconi, one of the protagonists of Gente di mare 2. In 2008, she played a major role in the sitcom Radio Sex, directed by Alessandro Baracco.

Between 2007 and 2008 she took part in four movies: Leonardo Pieraccioni wanted her for the role of Giustina in A Beautiful Wife, Francesco Patierno chose her for Il mattino ha l'oro in bocca, Spike Lee, after casting her personally, had her play Fabiola, one of the victims of the Nazi massacre of Sant'Anna di Stazzema, in Miracle at St. Anna and finally in 2008 Stefano Tummolini offered her the role of Stella in Un altro pianeta (Eng.: One Day in a Life), a film shown at the 2008 Venice Film Festival, where it was awarded the Queer Lion, and at the Sundance Film Festival in 2009.

In 2009, she acted in the television miniseries Le segretarie del sesto piano, directed by Angelo Longoni, and in the movie Feisbum!, directed by Emanuele Sana.

In 2010, she appeared in the television series Tutti pazzi per amore 2, directed by Riccardo Milani, in which she played the character of Bea, and in the film noir La donna velata, directed by Edoardo Margheriti.

In 2010 and 2011, she played Martha in Maschi contro femmine (Males vs Females) and Femmine contro maschi (Females vs Males), both directed by Fausto Brizzi.

In 2011, she acted in C'è chi dice no (Eng. title: Some Say No), directed by Giambattista Avellino, Cacao, directed by Luca Rea, and Amici miei come tutto ebbe inizio, directed by Neri Parenti.

In 2011, Francini was awarded the Biraghi Prize as "Shooting Star of the year" at the 68th Venice Film Festival, given by the Italian National Syndicate of Film Journalists.

In 2011, she was part of the main cast in the television programme Colorado broadcast by Italia 2. That same year she also acted in La peggior settimana della mia vita (English title: The Worst Week of My Life), directed by Alessandro Genovesi and in Un natale per due, a SKY Cinema production, which had the highest share ever recorded on the Italian SKY network, directed by Giambattista Avellino where apart from having a major role she also performed Carmen by Bizet.
 
Finally that year, she returned to Rai 1 to once again embody the character of Bea in Tutti pazzi per amore 3, directed by Laura Muscardin.

In 2012, she acted in the television mini series Nero Wolfe directed by Riccardo Donna and broadcast by Rai 1.

In 2011, she was chosen as testimonial for Dolce&Gabbana in their men's SS2012 world campaign.

Filmography

References

External links

 Official Site
 Official Facebook fanpage of Chiara Francini
  Official Twitter of Chiara Francini
  - Dal sito Moviement

Italian film actresses
Actors from Florence
Living people
Italian television actresses
21st-century Italian actresses
1979 births
Drag Race Italia